The Last Ship is the eleventh studio album by English musician Sting, released on 20 September 2013 in Germany and on 24 September 2013 in the UK and US. It contains songs written for and inspired by the musical The Last Ship, which was then in production and would premiere in June 2014. The Last Ship is the first full-length LP of original material released by Sting since his 2003 album Sacred Love.

The album, like the musical, takes inspiration from the closing of the shipyards in and around the historic shipbuilding town of Wallsend, where Sting grew up. The album features guest artists with roots in the northeast of England, including Brian Johnson from AC/DC, Jimmy Nail, The Unthanks, The Wilson Family, and Kathryn Tickell.

Background
The album is inspired by the musical of the same name, which premiered in June 2014, and whose songs were written by Sting. The play explores the themes of homecoming and self-discovery, drawing upon Sting's memories of growing up in the shipbuilding town of Wallsend, along with his reflections on the complexity of relationships, the passage of time and the importance of family and community.

Of the album's twelve songs and the musical's roughly twenty songs, only six are common to both (although the deluxe version of the album includes another three, and the "super deluxe" version includes another four). In some cases, the differences are due to changes to the musical after all the album had already been recorded, such as the song "What Say You Meg?" being written to replace "Practical Arrangement".

Commercial performance
The Last Ship  debuted at No. 13 on the Billboard 200, and No. 6 on the Top Rock Albums, selling 20,000 copies in the first week.  The album has sold 90,000 copies in the United States as of September 2016.

Formats
The album is available as both a digital and physical release in two configurations: a standard 12-song version (also available on vinyl) and a 2-disc deluxe version with 5 additional tracks. Moreover, a 2-disc super deluxe edition with 20 tracks and special packaging is available.

Track listing

Personnel
 Sting – vocals, acoustic guitar, bass guitar, orchestral bells, cymbal
 Rob Mathes – piano, keyboards, acoustic guitar, background vocals
 Dominic Miller – electric guitar, acoustic guitar, gut string solo guitar ("It's Not the Same Moon")
 Ira Coleman – bass guitar
 Joe Bonadio – drums, percussion
 Peter Tickell – violin, mandolin (solo on "What Have We Got?" and "Show Some Respect")
 Julian Sutton – melodeon
 Kathryn Tickell – violin, Northumbrian smallpipes (solo on "The Last Ship" and "Sky Hooks and Tartan Paint")
 Jo Lawry – vocals ("Shipyard"), duet vocal (on "Practical Arrangement" (Full Original Duet)), background vocals
 Jimmy Nail – vocals ("What Have We Got?" and "Shipyard"), background vocals
 Brian Johnson – vocals ("Shipyard" and "Sky Hooks and Tartan Paint")
 Thomas Bowes – violin (concertmaster)
 Emlyn Singleton – violin (principal second violin)
 Rita Manning, Boguslaw Kostecki, Warren Zielinski, Cathy Thompson, Chris Tombling, Debbie Widdup, Mark Berrow, Gaby Lester, Steve Morris – violin
 Peter Lale – viola (principal)
 Bruce White, Andy Parker – viola
 Anthony Pleeth – cello (principal)
 Martin Loveday, Dave Daniels – cello
 Jon Carnac – clarinet
 Gavin McNaughton – bassoon
 Richard Watkins, David Pyatt, Nicholas Korth, Michael Thompson – French horn
 John Barclay, Kate Moore, Tom Rees-Roberts, Richard Edwards – trumpet
 Richard Edwards – tenor trombone
 Andy Wood – euphonium
 Owen Slade – tuba
 Rachel Unthank – lead vocal ("Peggy's Song"), clogs ("What Have We Got?")
 Becky Unthank – duet vocal ("So to Speak")
 The Wilson Family – group vocals ("The Last Ship", "Ballad of the Great Eastern", "What Have We Got?", "The Last Ship (Reprise)", "Shipyard", "Hadaway", "Sky Hooks and Tartan Paint", "Show Some Respect")
 Alan Stepansky – cello ("It's Not the Same Moon")
 Dave Mann – alto saxophone ("Jock the Singing Welder")
 Aaron Heick – tenor saxophone ("Jock the Singing Welder")
 Roger Rosenberg – baritone saxophone ("Jock the Singing Welder")
 Jeff Kievit – trumpet ("The Last Ship", "Dead Man's Boots", "The Last Ship (Reprise)")
 Tony Kadleck – trumpet ("The Last Ship", "Dead Man's Boots", "The Last Ship (Reprise)")
 Bob Carlisle – French horn ("The Last Ship", "Dead Man's Boots", "The Last Ship (Reprise)")
 Chris Komer – French horn ("The Last Ship", "Dead Man's Boots", "The Last Ship (Reprise)")
 Mike Davis – tenor trombone ("The Last Ship", "Dead Man's Boots", "The Last Ship (Reprise)")
 Richard Harris – euphonium ("The Last Ship", "Dead Man's Boots", "The Last Ship (Reprise)")
 Marcus Rojas – tuba ("The Last Ship", "Dead Man's Boots", "The Last Ship (Reprise)")

Technical
 Sting – production
 Rob Mathes – production, orchestra arrangement and conduction
 Donal Hodgson – recording, mixing
 Peter Cobbin – orchestra recording, additional mixing ("The Last Ship", "Dead Man's Boots", "And Yet", "August Winds", "Language of Birds", "Practical Arrangement", "Ballad of the Great Eastern", "I Love Her But She Loves Someone Else", "The Last Ship (Reprise)")
 Alex Venguer – additional recording
 Jonathan Allen – orchestra recording
 Jill Dell'Abate – production manager
 Isobel Griffiths, Ltd. – orchestra contractor
 Charlotte Matthews – assistant orchestra contractor
 Rich Rich – Pro Tools engineering
 Brett Meyer – Pro Tools engineering
 Paul Pritchard – Pro Tools engineering
 Toby Hulbert – Pro Tools engineering
 Rael Jones – Pro Tools engineering
 Lars Fox – additional engineering and editing
 Angus Cowen – assistant engineering
 Mark Broughton – assistant engineering
 Danny Quatrochi – Sting's guitar technician
 Mike Casteel – music preparation
 Lori Casteel – music preparation
 Dave Hage – music preparation assistant
 Scott Hull – mastering

Charts and certifications

Weekly charts

Year-end charts

Certifications

References

2013 albums
Sting (musician) albums
Cherrytree Records albums
A&M Records albums
Concept albums
Albums produced by Rob Mathes
Sea shanties albums
Folk albums by English artists